Denise Cumberland, known under the performance name of Dancehall Queen Stacey, is a Jamaican dancer who was crowned Dancehall Queen there in 1999.

Biography
Denise Cumberland (a.k.a. Dancehall Queen Stacey) was born in Cockburn Gardens, Jamaica.

Artistic career
Dancehall Queen Stacey has toured with Patra and can also be seen dancing in the 1999 dancehall video "Girl's Prayer" by Beenie Man.

References 

Living people
Dancehall dancers
Jamaican female dancers
Year of birth missing (living people)